Sporting Clube de Bafatá is a Guinea-Bissauan football club based in Bafatá. They play in the top division in Guinean football, the Campeonato Nacional da Guiné-Bissau.

Achievements
Campeonato Nacional da Guiné-Bissau: 2
 1987, 2008

Performance in CAF competitions
CAF Champions League:
2009 – withdraw

Bissau
Bafatá